Antoniadis or Antoniades (phonetically Antoniádhis) is a Greek surname. The female version of the name is Antoniadou (Αντωνιάδου) or Antoniadi (Αντωνιάδη). Antoniadis is a patronymic surname which literally means "the child of Antonis". Notable examples include:

Antonios Antoniadis (born 1946), Greek medical professor
Antonis Antoniadis (born 1946), Greek footballer
Antonis Antoniadis (admiral) (born 1946), Greek naval officer
Dimitrios Antoniadis (born 1992), Greek cyclist
Emmanouil Antoniadis (1791–1863), Greek revolutionary
John Antoniadis (born 1986), Greek astrophysicist
Nikolaos Antoniadis (born 1971), Greek sport shooter
Pantelis Antoniadis (born 1994), Greek footballer

See also 

Antoniades
Antoniadi (disambiguation)
Antoniadou

Greek-language surnames
Surnames
Patronymic surnames
Surnames from given names